Al-Amri is an Arabic language surname. Notable people with the surname include:
 Abdulelah Al-Amri (1997), Saudi Arabian footballer
 Abdul Rahman al-Amri (1973–2007), Saudi Arabian extrajudicial prisoner of the United States
 Ali Al-Amri (1987), Saudi Arabian long-distance runner
 Ali Al-Amri (footballer) (1941), Emirati footballer
 Hassan al-Amri (1920–1988/1989), Yemeni politician
 Marwa Amri (1989), Tunisian freestyle wrestler
 Mohammed Al-Amri (born 1991), Saudi Arabian footballer
 Muhammad Musa al-Amri (born 1965), Yemeni politician
 Raed Al-Amri (born 1989), Saudi Arabian footballer
 Saleh Al-Amri (born 1993), Saudi Arabian footballer
 Tariq Al-Amri (born 1990), Saudi Arabian long-distance runner

References 

Arabic-language surnames
Surnames of Saudi Arabian origin
Surnames of Omani origin
Surnames of Qatari origin
Surnames of Yemeni origin
Surnames of Indonesian origin
Surnames of Emirati origin
Surnames of Jordanian origin